Sohan asali (from asal "honey") is a kind of Iranian confectionery (sohan) originating in Esfahan, Iran. 

It is made of honey, sugar, saffron, almond, pistachios and other nuts and cooking oil. It’s akin to a hard toffee, being brittle and breaking into shards.  It varies from the more ubiquitous Sohan from the city of Qom (sohān-e-Qomi) as it uses no wheat and much less butter and/or oil. So it’s not as short and holds its structure whilst Qom Sohan can disintegrate into powder when pressed hard.

External links 
Sohan asali in Persian Wikibooks

Nut confections
Iranian desserts
Almond desserts